Pseudephebe minuscula is a species of fruticose lichen in the family Parmeliaceae. In North America, it is known colloquially as coarse rockwool. It has an antitropical distribution.

Description
The lichen has a dark brown to almost black filamentous thallus, comprising individual cylindrical branches, closely attached to the rock substrate, often flattened, measuring 0.2–0.5 mm thick. It is common in windswept arctic and alpine environments, where it grows on granitic rocks and pebbles.

References

Parmeliaceae
Lichens of Antarctica
Lichens of Asia
Lichens of Europe
Lichens of Subarctic America
Lichens described in 1878
Lichen species
Taxa named by William Nylander (botanist)
Taxa named by Ferdinand Christian Gustav Arnold
Lichens of the Arctic